The Jewish Quarterly-Wingate Literary Prize is an annual British literary prize inaugurated in 1977. It is named after the host Jewish Quarterly and the prize's founder Harold Hyam Wingate. The award recognises Jewish and non-Jewish writers resident in the UK, British Commonwealth, Europe and Israel who "stimulate an interest in themes of Jewish concern while appealing to the general reader".  the winner receives £4,000.

The Jewish Chronicle called it "British Jewry's top literary award", and Jewish World said it is a "prestigious literature prize".

Winners

The blue ribbon  signifies the winner.

1996

Fiction
 Alan Isler, The Prince of West End Avenue (Jonathan Cape)

Non-fiction
 Theo Richmond, Konin: One Man's Quest for a Vanished Jewish Community (Jonathan Cape)

1997
 (fiction) W. G. Sebald, The Emigrants
 (fiction) Clive Sinclair, The Lady with the Laptop
 (nonfiction) "Prize withdrawn from original recipient due to it being a work of fiction, now shared with shortlist"
Louise Kehoe, In this Dark House: A Memoir
Silvia Rodgers, Red Saint, Pink Daughter
George Steiner, No Passion Spent: Essays 1978–1995

1998
The shortlists comprised:

Fiction
 Anne Michaels, Fugitive Pieces (Bloomsbury)
Esther Freud, Gaglow (Penguin)
David Grossman, The ZigZag Kid (Bloomsbury) 
Mordecai Richler, Barney's Version (Chatto & Windus)

Non-fiction
  Claudia Roden, The Book of Jewish Food: An Odyssey from Samarkand to New York
Leila Berg, Flickerbook (Granta)
Sally Berkovic, Under My Hat (Josephs Bookstore)
Jenny Diski, Skating to Antarctica (Granta)

1999
The shortlists comprised:

Fiction
  Dorit Rabinyan, Persian Brides (Canongate)
 Jay Rayner, Day of Atonement (Black Swan)
Savyon Liebrecht, Apples from the Desert (Laki Books)
Paolo Maurensig, Luneberg Variations (Phoenix House)

Non-fiction
  Edith Velmans, Edith's Book: The True Story of a Young Girl's Courage and Survival During World War II (Viking)
 David Hare, Via Dolorosa (Faber & Faber)
 Michael Ignatieff, Isaiah Berlin (Chatto & Windus)
 Niall Ferguson, The World's Banker, (Weidenfeld & Nicolson)

2000

Fiction
  Howard Jacobson, The Mighty Walzer (Jonathan Cape)
Nathan Englander, For the Relief of Unbearable Urges (Faber & Faber)
Elena Lappin, Foreign Brides (Picador)
Bernice Rubens, I, Dreyfus (Abacus)

Non-fiction
  Wladyslaw Szpilman, The Pianist (Viking)
Anthony Rudolf, The Arithmetic of Mind (Bellew Publishing)
Lisa Appignanesi, Losing the Dead (Chatto & Windus)
David Vital, A People Apart: The Jews in Europe 1789-1939 (Oxford University Press)

2001
The winners were announced on 30 April 2001. The shortlists comprised:

Fiction
  Mona Yahia, When the Grey Beetles took over Baghdad (Peter Halban)
Linda Grant, When I Lived in Modern Times (Granta)
Lawrence Norfolk, In the Shape of a Boar (Weidenfeld & Nicolson)
Elisabeth Russell Taylor, Will Dolores Come to Tea? (Arcadia)

Non-fiction
  Mark Roseman, A Past In Hiding: Memory and Survival in Nazi Germany (Allen Lane)
 Michael Billig, Rock 'n Roll Jews (Five Leaves)
Hugo Gryn and Naomi Gryn, Chasing Shadows (Viking)
 Louise London, Whitehall and the Jews 1933-1948 (Cambridge University Press)

2002
The winners were announced on 2 May 2002. The shortlists comprised:

Fiction
 WG Sebald, Austerlitz (Hamish Hamilton)
Agnes Desarthe, Five Photos of My Wife (Flamingo)
Zvi Jagendorf, Wolfy and the Strudelbakers (Dewi Lewis)
Emma Richler, Sister Crazy (Flamingo)

Non-fiction
  Oliver Sacks, Uncle Tungsten: Memories of a Chemical Boyhood (Picador)
John Gross,	A Double Thread (Chatto & Windus)
Joseph Roth, The Wandering Jews (Granta)
Mihail Sebastian, Journal 1935-44 (William Heinemann)

2003
The winners were announced on 8 May 2003. The shortlists comprised:

Fiction
  Zadie Smith, The Autograph Man (Penguin Books
 Arnost Lustig, Lovely Green Eyes (Harvill)
 Micheal O'Siadhail, The Gossamer Wall (Bloodaxe)
 Norman Lebrecht, The Song of Names (Review)
 Dannie Abse, The Strange Case of Dr Simmonds & Dr Glas (Robson)

Non-fiction
  Sebastian Haffner, Defying Hitler: A Memoir (Weidenfeld & Nicolson)
 Roman Frister, Impossible Love (Weidenfeld & Nicolson)
 Ian Thomson, Primo Levi (Hutchinson)
 Carole Angier, The Double Bond (Viking Penguin)
 Roma Ligocka, The Girl in the Red Coat (Sceptre)

2004
The winners were announced on 6 May 2004. The shortlists comprised:

Fiction
  David Grossman, Someone to Run With (Bloomsbury)
 Dannie Abse, New & Collected Poems (Hutchinson)
 A.B. Yehoshua, The Liberated Bride (Peter Halban)

Non-fiction
  Amos Elon, The Pity of It All: A Portrait of Jews in Germany 1743–1933 (Penguin)
 Mark Glanville, The Goldberg Variations: From Football Hooligan to Opera Singer (Flamingo)
 Stanley Price, Somewhere to Hang My Hat (New Island)
 Igal Sarna, Broken Promises: Israeli Lives (Atlantic Books)

2005
The winners were announced on 17 May 2005. The shortlists comprised:

Fiction
  David Bezmozgis, Natasha and Other Stories (Jonathan Cape)
Moris Farhi, Young Turk (Saqi)
Howard Jacobson The Making of Henry (Jonathan Cape)

Non-fiction
  Amos Oz, A Tale of Love and Darkness (Chatto & Windus)
 Simon Goldhill, The Temple of Jerusalem (Profile Books)
 Joanna Olczak-Ronikier, In the Garden of Memory (Weidenfeld & Nicolson)
 Béla Zsolt, Nine Suitcases (Jonathan Cape)

2006
The shortlist comprised:
 Imre Kertész, Fatelessness
 Michael Arditti, Unity (Maia Press)
 Paul Kriwaczek, Yiddish Civilisation: The Rise and Fall of a Forgotten Nation (Weidenfeld & Nicolson)
 Neill Lochery, The View from the Fence, The Arab-Israeli Conflict from the Present to Its Roots (Continuum)
 Jean Molla, Sobibor (Aurora Metro)
 Nicholas Stargardt, Witnesses of War: Children’s Lives under the Nazis (Jonathan Cape)
 Tamar Yellin, Genizah at the House of Shepher (Toby Press)

2007
The shortlist was announced on 25 February 2007.
 Howard Jacobson, Kalooki Nights (Cape)
 Carmen Callil, Bad Faith (Cape)
 Adam LeBor, City of Oranges (Bloomsbury)
 Andrew Miller, The Earl of Petticoat Lane (Heinemann)
 Irène Némirovsky, Suite Française (Chatto)
 A. B. Yehoshua, A Woman in Jerusalem (Halban)

2008
The winner was announced on 5 May 2008. The shortlist comprised:
 Etgar Keret, Missing Kissinger (Chatto and Windus)
Phillippe Grimbert, Secret (translated by Polly McLean, Portobello Books)
Philip Davis, Bernard Malamud (Oxford University Press)
Tom Segev, 1967 (translated by Jessica Cohen, Abacus)

2009
The shortlist was announced on 31 March 2009. The winner was announced on 6 June 2009.
 Fred Wander, The Seventh Well (Granta)
Amir Gutfreund, The World a Moment Later (translated by Jessica Cohen, Toby Press)
Zoë Heller, The Believers (Fig Tree)
Ladislaus Löb, Dealing with Satan (Jonathan Cape)
Denis MacShane, Globalising Hatred (Weidenfeld & Nicolson)
Jackie Wullschlager, Chagall: Love and Exile (Allen Lane)

2010
The shortlist was announced on 22 April 2010. The winner was announced on 16 June 2010.
 Adina Hoffman, My Happiness Bears No Relation to Happiness: A Poet's Life in the Palestinian Century (Yale University Press)
Julia Franck, The Blind Side of the Heart (Harvill Secker)
Simon Mawer, The Glass Room (Little, Brown)
Shlomo Sand, The Invention of the Jewish People (Verso)

2011
The shortlist was announced on 4 April 2011. The winner was announced on 6 June 2011.
 David Grossman, To the End of the Land (Jonathan Cape)
Howard Jacobson, The Finkler Question (Bloomsbury)
Edmund de Waal, The Hare with Amber Eyes (Chatto and Windus)
Eli Amir, The Dove Flyer (Halban)
Anthony Julius, Trials of the Diaspora (Oxford University Press)
Jenny Erpenbeck, Visitation (translated by Susan Bernofsky, Portobello Books)

2012
[no award]

2013
The winner was announced on 27 February 2013. The shortlist comprised:
 Shalom Auslander, Hope: A Tragedy (Picador)
Deborah Levy, Swimming Home (And Other Stories)
Amos Oz, Scenes from Village Life (Chatto and Windus)
Cynthia Ozick, Foreign Bodies  (Atlantic Books)
Stanley Price and Munro Price, The Road to the Apocalypse (Notting Hill Editions)
Bernard Wasserstein, On the Eve (Profile Books)

2014
The shortlist was announced on 27 November 2013. The winner was announced on 27 February 2014.
 Edith Pearlman, Binocular Vision (Pushkin Press)
  Otto Dov Kulka,  Landscapes of the Metropolis of Death (Allen Lane)
 Shani Boianjiu, The People of Forever Are Not Afraid (Hogarth)
 Ben Marcus, The Flame Alphabet (Granta)
 Anouk Markovits, I Am Forbidden (Hogarth)
 Yudit Kiss, The Summer My Father Died (Telegram-Saqi)

2015
The shortlist was announced on 13 January 2015. The winners - one each for fiction and non-fiction, in a departure from recent tradition since 2005 - were announced on 20 April 2015.

Fiction
  Michel Laub, Diary of the Fall - Translated by Margaret Jull Costa (Harvill) 
 Zeruya Shalev, Remains of Love - Translated by Philip Simpson (Bloomsbury) 
 Dror Burstein, Netanya - Translated by Todd Hasak-Lowy (Dalkey Archive)

Non-fiction
  Thomas Harding, Hanns and Rudolf: The German Jew and the Hunt for the Kommandant of Auschwitz (Heinemann)
 Antony Polonsky, Jews in Poland and Russia (Littman Library) 
 Gary Shteyngart, Little Failure: A Memoir  (Penguin) 
 Hanna Krall, Chasing the King of Hearts - Translated by Philip Boehm (Peirene)

2016
The short list was announced on 22 February 2016. The winner was announced on 14 March 2016.

  Nikolaus Wachsmann, KL: A History of the Nazi Concentration Camps
 Claire Hajaj, Ishmael’s Oranges 
 Howard Jacobson, J
 Zachary Leader, The Life of Saul Bellow
 Alison Pick, Between Gods
 George Prochnik, The Impossible Exile
 Dan Stone, The Liberation of the Camps

2017
The shortlist was announced January 2017. The joint winners were announced 23 February 2017.

Anna Bikont, translated by Alissa Valles, The Crime and the Silence
David Cesarani, Final Solution: The Fate of the Jews 1933-1949
 Ayelet Gundar-Goshen, translated by Sondra Silverston, Waking Lions
Walter Kempowski, translated by Anthea Bell, All for Nothing 
 Philippe Sands, East West Street: On the Origins of Genocide and Crimes Against Humanity

2018
The shortlist announced January 2018. The winner was announced in February.

 Michael Frank, The Mighty Franks: A Memoir
Linda Grant, The Dark Circle
Mya Guarnieri Jaradat, The Unchosen: The Lives of Israel's New Others
Joanne Limburg, Small Pieces: A Book of Lamentations
George Prochnik, Stranger in a Strange Land: Searching for Gershom Scholem and Jerusalem
Laurence Rees, The Holocaust: A New History

2019 
The shortlist announced January 2019. The winner was announced in February.

  Françoise Frenkel, No Place to Lay One's Head
 Chloe Benjamin, The Immortalists (Tinder Press/Headline)
 Lisa Halliday, Asymmetry (Granta)
 Dara Horn, Eternal Life (W.W. Norton &Co Ltd)
 Raphael Jerusalmy, Evacuation (Text Publishing) (translated by Penny Hueston)
 Mark Sarvas, Memento Park (Farrar, Straus & Giroux).

2020 
The shortlist announced January 2020. The winner was announced in February.

 Linda Grant, A Stranger City 
 Benjamin Balint, Kafka's Last Trial: The Case of a Literacy Legacy 
 Ayelet Gundar-Goshen, Liar 
 Dani Shapiro, Inheritance
 Gary Shteyngart, Lake Success
 George Szirtes, The Photographer at Sixteen
 Howard Jacobson, Live a Little

2021 
The winner was announced on March 7, 2021. The shortlist comprised:
 Yaniv Iczkovits, The Slaughterman's Daughter (translated by Orr Scharf; MacLehose Press / Schocken Books)
 Hadley Freeman, House of Glass (HarperCollins)
 Goldie Goldbloom, On Division (Farrar, Straus and Giroux)
 Bess Kalb, Nobody Will Tell You This But Me (Little, Brown)
 Colum McCann, Apeirogon (Bloomsbury)
 Ariana Neumann, When Time Stopped: A Memoir of My Father's War and What Remains (Simon & Schuster)
 Jonathan Safran Foer, We are the Weather: Saving the Planet Begins at Breakfast (Hamish Hamilton / Penguin Books)

2022 
The winner was announced on February 18, 2022. The shortlist comprised: 

  Nicole Krauss, To Be a Man (Bloomsbury)
 Nir Baram, At Night's End (translated by Jessica Cohen, Text Publishing) 
 Edmund de Waal, Letters to Camondo (Chatto & Windus/Vintage Publishing)
 Arthur Green, Judaism for the World (Yale University Press)
 Wendy Lower, The Ravine (Houghton Mifflin Harcourt)
 Eshkol Nevo, The Last Interview (translated by Sondra Silverston, Other Press)
 Anne Sebba, Ethel Rosenberg (St. Martins Press, Orion Books)

Notes

External links
 Jewish Quarterly-Wingate Prize
 Wingate Literary Prize at The Harold Hyam Wingate Foundation

British literary awards
Jewish literary awards
Awards established in 1977
1977 establishments in the United Kingdom
Literary awards by magazines and newspapers